, also known as The Glorious Road to Grilled Beef, is a 2003 anime film. It is the 11th film based on the popular comedy manga and anime series Crayon Shin-chan. The first film in the series to use digital ink and paint. The film was released to theatres on 19 April 2003 in Japan. This movie was also released in India on Hungama TV as Shin Chan Masala Story The Movie on 21 June 2014. It was released as Crayon Shinchan The Movie: Glorious Grilled Yakiniku Road with English subtitles on VCD and DVD by PMP Entertainment.
 
The film was produced by Shin-Ei Animation, the studio behind the anime television.

Plot

Misae reveals that she was planning a massive tasty dinner for that night, and to save money for it, she was cutting costs on breakfast. That elates all of them.

Just then, a car crashes in their compound wall, breaking the wall and Shiro's bowl. A man comes out and tells that some people are chasing him for something he has and they need to help him. Hiroshi suggests him to go to the cops, but the man refuses. Just then, Shin-Chan tells there is someone else too, which scares the man, and he tells that he has given that thing to the Noharas.

The Noharas refuse to go with them. Just then they chase the Noharas but they family escapes and runs. When they run a man helps them and they are separated. They come to know that they are called from their head office in Hatami. Their journey to Hatami was full of adventures.

Cast
Akiko Yajima as Shinnosuke Nohara
Keiji Fujiwara as Hiroshi Nohara
Miki Narahashi as Misae Nohara
Satomi Kōrogi as Himawari Nohara
Tesshō Genda as Action Kamen
Junko Minagawa as Amagi
Tomomi Kahara as herself
Masashi Ebara as Shimoda
Hiroya Ishimaru as Man
Unshō Ishizuka as Boss

See also
 List of Crayon Shin-chan films

References

External links
 
 

Films directed by Tsutomu Mizushima
2003 anime films
Fierceness That Invites Storm! Yakisuiku Road of Honor
Toho animated films
Films set in Atami